Cree  (also known as Cree–Montagnais–Naskapi) is a dialect continuum of Algonquian languages spoken by approximately 117,000 people across Canada, from the Northwest Territories to Alberta to Labrador. If considered one language, it is the aboriginal language with the highest number of speakers in Canada. The only region where Cree has any official status is in the Northwest Territories, alongside eight other aboriginal languages. There, Cree is spoken mainly in Fort Smith and Hay River.

Names
Endonyms are:
   (Plains Cree)
   (Woods Cree)
   (Western Swampy Cree)
   (Eastern Swampy Cree)
   (Moose Cree)
   (Southern East Cree)
   (Northern East Cree)
  (Atikamekw)
  (Western Montagnais, Piyekwâkamî dialect)
  (Western Montagnais, Betsiamites dialect)
  (Eastern Montagnais)

Origin and diffusion 
Cree is believed to have begun as a dialect of the Proto-Algonquian language spoken between 2,500 and 3,000 years ago in the original Algonquian homeland, an undetermined area thought to be near the Great Lakes. The speakers of the proto-Cree language are thought to have moved north, and diverged rather quickly into two different groups on each side of James Bay. The eastern group then began to diverge into separate dialects, whereas the western grouping probably broke into distinct dialects much later. After this point it is very difficult to make definite statements about how different groups emerged and moved around, because there are no written works in the languages to compare, and descriptions by Europeans are not systematic; as well, Algonquian people have a tradition of bilingualism and even of outright adopting a new language from neighbours.

A traditional view among 20th-century anthropologists and historians of the fur trade posits that the Western Woods Cree and the Plains Cree (and therefore their dialects) did not diverge from other Cree peoples before 1670, when the Cree expanded out of their homeland near James Bay because of access to European firearms. By contrast, James Smith of the Museum of the American Indian stated, in 1987, that the weight of archeological and linguistic evidence puts the Cree as far west as the Peace River Region of Alberta before European contact.

Loss of language 
Doug Cuthand argues three reasons for the loss of the Cree language among many speakers over the nineteenth and twentieth centuries. First, residential schools cultivated the prejudice that their language was inferior. While students were still speaking their native language at home, their learning stopped at school. When they left residential schools as adults, they went home and their vocabulary and knowledge of language did not include concepts or forms that an adult speaker who had not been taken to a residential school would have.

Cuthand also argues that the loss of the Cree language can be attributed to the migration of native families away from the reserve, voluntarily or not. Oftentimes, the elders are left on the reserve. This breaks up the traditional intergenerational flow of lingual knowledge from elder to youth.

The third point Cuthand argues is that Cree language loss was adopted by the speakers. Parents stopped teaching their children their native language in the belief that doing so would help their children find economic success or avoid discrimination.

Dialect criteria 
The Cree dialect continuum can be divided by many criteria. In several dialects, including northern Plains Cree and Woods Cree, the long vowels  and  have merged into a single vowel, .

However, the most transparent phonological variation between different Cree dialects are the reflexes of Proto-Algonquian *l in the modern dialects, as shown below:

Another important phonological variation among the Cree dialects involves the palatalisation of Proto-Algonquian *k: East of the Ontario–Quebec border (except for Atikamekw), Proto-Algonquian *k has changed into  or  before front vowels. See the table above for examples in the * column.

Very often the Cree dialect continuum is divided into two languages: Cree and Montagnais. Cree includes all dialects which have not undergone the *k >  sound change (BC–QC) while Montagnais encompasses the territory where this sound change has occurred (QC–NL). These labels are very useful from a linguistic perspective but are confusing as East Cree then qualifies as Montagnais. For practical purposes, Cree usually covers the dialects which use syllabics as their orthography (including Atikamekw but excluding Kawawachikamach Naskapi), the term Montagnais then applies to those dialects using the Latin script (excluding Atikamekw and including Kawawachikamach Naskapi). The term Naskapi typically refers to Kawawachikamach (y-dialect) and Natuashish (n-dialect).

Dialect groups
The Cree dialects can be broadly classified into nine groups. Roughly from west to east:

Phonology
This table shows the possible consonant phonemes in the Cree language or one of its varieties.

Atikamekw uses  [],  [], and  [] (which also serves as  []).

Syntax

Cree features a complex polysynthetic morphosyntax. A common grammatical feature in Cree dialects, in terms of sentence structure, is non-regulated word order. Word order is not governed by a specific set of rules or structure; instead, "subjects and objects are expressed by means of inflection on the verb". Subject, Verb, and Object (SVO) in a sentence can vary in order, for example, SVO, VOS, OVS, and SOV.

Obviation is also a key aspect of the Cree language(s). In a sense, the obviative can be defined as any third-person ranked lower on a hierarchy of discourse salience than some other (proximate) discourse-participant.  "Obviative animate nouns, [in the Plains Cree dialect for instance], are marked by [a suffix] ending , and are used to refer to third persons who are more peripheral in the discourse than the proximate third person". For example:

The suffix  marks Susan as the obviative, or 'fourth' person, the person furthest away from the discourse.

The Cree language has grammatical gender in a system that classifies nouns as animate or inanimate. The distribution of nouns between animate or inanimate is not phonologically transparent, which means gender must be learned along with the noun.
As is common in polysynthetic languages, a Cree word can be very long, and express something that takes a series of words in English. This means that changing the word order in Cree can place emphasis on different pieces of the sentence. Wolfart and Carroll give the following example by transposing the two Cree words:

  → 'He asked the old man.'
  → 'It was the old man he asked.'

Writing
Cree dialects, except for those spoken in eastern Quebec and Labrador, are traditionally written using Cree syllabics, a variant of Canadian Aboriginal syllabics, but can be written with the Latin script as well. Both writing systems represent the language phonetically. Cree is always written from left to right horizontally. The easternmost dialects are written using the Latin script exclusively. The dialects of Plains Cree, Woods Cree, and western Swampy Cree use Western Cree syllabics and the dialects of eastern Swampy Cree, East Cree, Moose Cree, and Naskapi use Eastern Cree syllabics.

Syllabics 

In Cree syllabics, each symbol, which represents a consonant, can be written four ways, each direction representing its corresponding vowel. Some dialects of Cree have up to seven vowels, so additional diacritics are placed after the syllabic to represent the corresponding vowels. Finals represent stand-alone consonants. The Cree language also has two semivowels. The semivowels may follow other consonants or be on their own in a word.

The following tables show the syllabaries of Eastern and Western Cree dialects, respectively:

Speakers of various Cree dialects have begun creating dictionaries to serve their communities. Some projects, such as the Cree Language Resource Project, are developing an online bilingual Cree dictionary for the Cree language.

Cree syllabics has not commonly or traditionally used the period. Instead, either a full-stop glyph or a double em-width space has been used between words to signal the transition from one sentence to the next.

Romanization 

For Plains Cree and Swampy Cree, Standard Roman Orthography (SRO) uses fourteen letters of the ISO basic Latin alphabet to denote the dialect's ten consonants (and ) and seven vowels (and ). Upper case letters are not used. For more details on the phonetic values of these letters or variant orthographies, see the § Phonology section above.

In other dialects, s is used even when pronounced like .

The stops, p, t, k, and the affricate, c, can be pronounced either voiced or unvoiced, but the symbols used for writing these sounds all correspond to the unvoiced pronunciation, e.g.  not ,  not , etc.

Use of either the macron or circumflex is acceptable, but usage should be consistent within a work. The vowel ē , used in southern Plains Cree, is always long and the grapheme  is never used. In northern Plains Cree the sound has merged with ī, and thus  is not used at all.

The use of unmarked  and marked  for the phonemes  and  emphasizes the relationship that can exist between these two vowels.  There are situations where o can be lengthened to ō, as for example in   'sing (now)!' and   'sing (later)!'.

In alphabetic writing, the use of punctuation has been inconsistent.  For instance, in the Plains Cree dialect, the interrogative enclitic cî can be included in the sentence to mark a yes–no question such that this is sometimes considered to be sufficient without including a question mark (?).  However, in many modern publications and text collections (cf. The Counselling Speeches of Jim Kâ-Nîpitêhtêw (1998)) full punctuation is used.

Additionally, other interrogatives (where, when, what, why, who) can be used, as in other languages, and questions marks can thus be used for such questions in Cree as well.

Hyphenation can be used to separate a particle from the root word that it prefixes, especially particles that precede verbs ("preverbs" or "indeclinable preverbs") or nouns ("prenouns" or "indeclinable prenouns"). Note that  can neither stand alone as a separate word, nor is it an essential part of a stem. There are some more complex situations where it is difficult to determine whether an element is a particle. Some frequently used compound words can be written as unhyphenated. Stress can be predicted in some cases based on hyphenation.

Vowel reduction or vowel dropping, as is common of unstressed short i , is not denoted in order to be more cross-dialectal—instead of using apostrophes, the full unreduced vowels are written.

Representation of sandhi (such as  → ) can be written or not written, as sandhi representation introduces greater complexity. There are additional rules regarding h and iy that may not match a given speaker's speech, to enable a standardized transcription.

Contact languages

Cree is also a component language in at least five contact languages, Michif, Northern Michif, Bungi, Oji-Cree, and Nehipwat. Michif and Bungi are spoken by members of the Métis, and historically by some Voyageurs and European settlers of Western Canada and parts of the Northern United States.  Nehipwat and Oji-Cree are blends of Cree with Assiniboine (Nehipwat) and Ojibwe (Oji-Cree).

Michif is a mixed language which combines Cree with French. For the most part, Michif uses Cree verbs, question words, and demonstratives while using French nouns. Michif is unique to the Canadian prairie provinces as well as to North Dakota and Montana in the United States. Michif is still spoken in central Canada and in North Dakota.

Bungi is a creole based on Scottish English, Scots, Scottish Gaelic, Cree, and Ojibwe. Some French words have also been incorporated into its lexicon. This language flourished at and around the Red River Settlement (modern day location of Winnipeg, Manitoba) by the mid to late 1800s. Bungi is now virtually extinct, as its features are being abandoned in favor of standard English.

Cree has also been incorporated into another mixed language within Canada, Nehipwat, which is a blending of Cree with Assiniboine. Nehipwat is found only in a few southern Saskatchewan reserves and is now nearing extinction. Nothing is known of its structure.

Legal status

The social and legal status of Cree varies across Canada. Cree is one of the eleven official languages of the Northwest Territories, but is only spoken by a small number of people there in the area around the town of Fort Smith. It is also one of two principal languages of the regional government of Eeyou Istchee/Baie-James Territory in Northern Quebec, the other being French.

Support and revitalization 
Cree has about 117,000 documented speakers today. They are still a minority language given the dominance of English and French in Canada. There are programs in place to maintain and revitalize the language, though. In the Quebec James Bay Cree community, a resolution was put into action in 1988 that made Cree the language of education in primary schools and eventually elementary schools.

The Mistissini council decided to require their employees to learn Cree syllabics in 1991.

The Cree School Board now has their annual report available in both English and Cree.

There is a push to increase the availability of Cree stations on the radio.

In 2013, free Cree language electronic books for beginners became available for Alberta language teachers.

The Government of the Northwest Territories releases an annual report on First Nations languages. The 2016–2017 report features successes they have had in revitalizing and supporting and projects they are working on. For example, they released a Medicinal Plant Guide that had information in both Cree and English. An important part of making the guide was input from the elders. Another accomplishment was the dubbing of a movie in Cree. They are working on broadcasting a radio station that "will give listeners music and a voice for our languages".

Joshua Whitehead is one writer who has used the Cree language as part of his poetry.

See also

 Cree people

References

Bibliography

Ahenakew, Freda, Cree Language Structures: A Cree Approach. Pemmican Publications Inc., 1987. 
Ahenakew, Freda, Text-Based Grammar in Cree Language Education, Msc Thesis, University of Manitoba.  online
 Bakker, Peter and Robert A. Papen. "Michif: A Mixed Language based on French and Cree". Contact Languages: A Wider Perspective. Ed. Sarah G. Thomason. 17 vols. Philadelphia: John Benjamins Publishing Co. 1997. .
 Bloomfield, Leonard. Plains Cree Texts. New York: AMS Press, 1974. 
 Carter, Sarah. Aboriginal People and Colonizers of Western Canada to 1900. University of Toronto Press Inc. Toronto: 1999. .
 Castel, Robert J., and David Westfall. Castel's English–Cree Dictionary and Memoirs of the Elders Based on the Woods Cree of Pukatawagan, Manitoba. Brandon, Man: Brandon University Northern Teacher Education Program, 2001. 
 Dahlstrom, Amy. Plains Cree Morphosyntax. Outstanding dissertations in linguistics. New York: Garland Pub, 1991. 
 Ellis, C. D. Spoken Cree, Level I, west coast of James Bay. Edmonton: University of Alberta Press, 2000. 
 Hirose, Tomio. Origins of predicates evidence from Plains Cree. Outstanding dissertations in linguistics. New York: Routledge, 2003. 
 Junker, Marie-Odile, Marguerite MacKenzie, Luci Salt, Alice Duff, Daisy Moar & Ruth Salt (réds) (2007–2008) Le Dictionnaire du cri de l'Est de la Baie James sur la toile: français-cri et cri-français  (dialectes du Sud et du Nord).
 LeClaire, Nancy, George Cardinal, Earle H. Waugh, and Emily Hunter. Alberta Elders' Cree Dictionary = Alperta Ohci Kehtehayak Nehiyaw Otwestamakewasinahikan. Edmonton: University of Alberta Press, 1998. 
 MacKenzie, Marguerite, Marie-Odile Junker, Luci Salt, Elsie Duff, Daisy Moar, Ruth Salt, Ella Neeposh & Bill Jancewicz (eds) (2004–2008) The Eastern James Bay Cree Dictionary on the Web : English-Cree and Cree-English (Northern and Southern dialect).
 Okimāsis, Jean and Wolvengrey, Arok.  How to spell it in Cree: the Standard Roman Orthography,  online
Steller, Lea-Katharina (née Virághalmy): Alkalmazkodni és újat adni – avagy „accomodatio“ a paleográfiában In: Paleográfiai kalandozások. Szentendre, 1995. 
 Wolfart, H. Christoph. Plains Cree A Grammatical Study. Transactions of the American Philosophical Society, new ser., v. 63, pt. 5. Philadelphia: American Philosophical Society, 1973. 
Wolfart, H. C. & Freda Ahenakew, The Student's Dictionary of Literary Plains Cree. Memoir 15, Algonquian and Iroquoian Linguistics, 1998. 
Wolvengrey, Arok, ed. nēhiýawēwin: itwēwina / Cree: Words / ᓀᐦᐃᔭᐍᐏᐣ: ᐃᑗᐏᓇ [includes Latin orthography and Cree syllabics]. [Cree–English English–Cree Dictionary – Volume 1: Cree-English; Volume 2: English-Cree]. Canadian Plains Research Center, 15 October 2001.

External links

 The Cree-Innu linguistic atlas
 The Cree-Innu linguistic atlas, .pdf
 The Gift of Language and Culture website
 Our Languages: Cree (Saskatchewan Indian Cultural Centre)
 Languagegeek: Cree—OpenType font repository of aboriginal languages (including Cree).
 Path of the Elders  – Explore Treaty 9, Aboriginal Cree & First Nations history.

Lessons 
 Nehinawe: Speak Cree 
 Cree Language Lessons 
 The East Cree language web
Cree on-line Spelling Lessons

Dictionaries 
 Online Eastern James Bay Cree dictionary (covers both Northern and Southern dialects)
 Online Cree dictionary
 Wasaho Ininiwimowin (Wasaho Cree) Dictionary at Kwayaciiwin Education Resource Centre

E-books 
 Little Cree Books

 
Cree
Language
Central Algonquian languages
Indigenous languages of the North American eastern woodlands
Indigenous languages of the North American Plains
Indigenous languages of the North American Subarctic
First Nations languages in Canada
Indigenous languages of North America
Vulnerable languages